Barry Cohen AM (3 April 1935 – 18 December 2017) was an Australian politician. He was a member of the Australian Labor Party (ALP) and served in federal parliament from 1969 to 1990, representing the Division of Robertson in New South Wales. He held ministerial office in the Hawke Government from 1983 to 1987.

Biography
Cohen was born in Griffith, New South Wales and educated at Griffith High School, Sydney Grammar School and North Sydney Technical High School. He received a Bachelor of Arts from the Australian National University. He was a businessman before entering politics.

He was the federal member for the seat of Robertson from 1969 until his retirement before the 1990 election. Following the Australian Labor Party's win under Bob Hawke at the 1983 election, he was Minister for Home Affairs and the Environment from 1983 to 1984 and then Minister for Arts, Heritage and the Environment until 1987.

At the 1999 New South Wales state election he was a candidate for Gosford, losing to the incumbent Liberal member, Chris Hartcher.

After politics
Cohen wrote a number of books on political anecdotes, and an autobiography:

Life with Gough (1996)
From Whitlam to Winston  (1997)
The Almost Complete Gough (2001)
The Life of the Party – Political Anecdotes (1987)
How to Become Prime Minister (1990)

In 2015, Cohen and three other former MPs brought a case before the High Court of Australia, purporting that reductions to their retirement allowances and limitations on the number of "domestic return trips per year" under the Members of Parliament (Life Gold Pass) Act 2002 were unconstitutional under S51(xxxi) of the Constitution of Australia. They lost the case in 2016, with the court finding that Parliament was entitled to vary the terms of allowances.

Personal
Cohen married Rae McNeill in October 1959 and they had three sons.

Although Cohen voted for the decriminalisation of homosexuality in the 1970s, he spoke out against gay marriage, arguing that "gay marriage and conventional marriage is [not] the same thing".

Cohen died on 18 December 2017, having been diagnosed with Alzheimer's disease several years earlier.

Honours
Cohen was appointed a Member of the Order of Australia in the Queen's Birthday Honours in 2007, for service to the Australian Parliament and to the community through a range of cultural and environmental roles and contributions to public discussion and debate.

A species of fossil marsupial, Yalkaparidon coheni, was named after him.

References

1935 births
2017 deaths
Australian Labor Party members of the Parliament of Australia
Members of the Australian House of Representatives for Robertson
Members of the Australian House of Representatives
Members of the Order of Australia
Australian businesspeople
Jewish Australian politicians
20th-century Australian politicians
People from Griffith, New South Wales
Neurological disease deaths in Australia
Deaths from Alzheimer's disease